The 2025 elections in India are expected to include the elections of the Rajya Sabha and 1 state and 1 union territory legislative assemblies.

Legislative assembly elections

 Tentative schedule as per assembly tenure

See also 
 2024 elections in India
 2025 Rajya Sabha elections
 2026 elections in India

References

 
Elections in India by year